Pablo Larraín Matte (born 19 August 1976) is a Chilean filmmaker. He has directed nine feature films and co-directed one television series, including the Academy Award-nominated films No (2012), Neruda (2016), Jackie (2016) and Spencer (2021). In 2017, Larraín and his brother Juan de Dios were the producers of Sebastián Lelio's A Fantastic Woman, which was the first Chilean film to win the Academy Award for Best Foreign Language Film. In 2021, he directed all eight episodes of the psychological romance horror miniseries Lisey's Story.

Early life and education 
Pablo Larraín Matte was born on 19 August 1976 in Santiago, Chile, the son of law professor (and later Independent Democrat Union senator) Hernán Larraín, and Magdalena Matte, Sebastián Piñera's former minister of Housing and Urbanism. He studied audiovisual communication at the University for the Arts, Sciences, and Communication in Santiago.

Career

Early career 
In 2003, Larraín co-founded with his brother, Juan de Dios Larraín, the production company Fábula, through which he develops his cinematic and advertising projects and supports the work of emerging international directors.

Larraín directed his first feature film Fuga in 2005. It was released in March 2006 and achieved international acclaim with several prizes at international film festivals, including the Cartagena Film Festival and the Málaga Film Festival. In 2008, he released his second feature-length film, Tony Manero, about a serial killer with an obsession for John Travolta's character in Saturday Night Fever, the film premiered at the 2008 Cannes Film Festival, where it was part of the Directors' Fortnight section. His next film, Post Mortem, was released in 2010 and centers on a coroner's assistant during the days of 1973 coup that brought Pinochet to power. The movie premiered at the 67th Venice International Film Festival, where it competed for the Golden Lion in the official competition section.

2010s 
In 2011, Larraín directed the television series Prófugos, which was the first series produced in Chile by HBO Latin America. The series was nominated for Best Drama Series at the 42nd International Emmy Awards.

In 2012, he released No, in which Gael García Bernal plays an advertising company executive who runs the "No" campaign in the 1988 plebiscite that ultimately voted Augusto Pinochet out of power. No premiered in the Directors' Fortnight section at the 2012 Cannes Film Festival where it won the Art Cinema Award for Best Director. The film was nominated for Best Foreign Language Film at the 85th Academy Awards, being the first Chilean nomination in the category. Alongside Tony Manero and Post Mortem, No has been considered a part of an "unintentional trilogy" by Larraín, with all three films being centered around stories set during Augusto Pinochet's dictatorship. Larraín has said, "In Chile, the right, as part of the Pinochet government, is directly responsible for what happened to culture during those years, not only by destroying it or restricting its spread, but also through its persecution of writers and artists."  He stated that "Chile found itself unable to express itself artistically for nearly twenty years" and also felt that "the right wing throughout the world is not very interested in culture and this reveals the ignorance that is probably theirs, because it is difficult for someone to make the most of something or to enjoy it if you have no knowledge of it".

In 2013, Larraín served as a member of the jury for the official competition at the 70th Venice International Film Festival. On 24 March 2014, The Wrap reported that Larraín was in negotiations to direct a new film version of Scarface for Universal Studios, with Paul Attanasio writing the script. The new version will be set in modern-day Los Angeles and would revolve around a Mexican immigrant rising in the criminal underworld. However, Larraín left the project.

Larraín's next film, The Club, centers around four Catholic priests who live in a secluded Chilean beach town, the film premiered at the 65th Berlin International Film Festival where it won the Silver Bear Grand Jury Prize. The film received a nomination for Best Foreigh Language Film at the 73rd Golden Globe Awards.

In 2016, Larrain reteamed with Bernal for Neruda, about the famous Chilean poet and politician Pablo Neruda during his years of exile. Neruda was also nominated for the Golden Globe Award for Best Foreign Language Film. That same year, Larrain made his English-language debut with the Jacqueline Kennedy Onassis biopic Jackie, starring Natalie Portman, Peter Sarsgaard, Greta Gerwig, Richard E. Grant, Billy Crudup, and John Hurt. The film received critical acclaim, with Jackie scoring numerous accolades, including Academy Award, Golden Globe, and SAG Award nominations for Portman, and winning the Platform Prize at the 2016 Toronto International Film Festival. In 2019, Larraín directed Ema, starring Mariana Di Girolamo and Gael García Bernal., The film premiered at the 76th Venice International Film Festival.

2020s 
In 2020, Larraín participated in the anthology series Homemade, the series was released on Netflix and consists of several short films following stories during the COVID-19 pandemic, directed by various directors of the world such as Ladj Ly, Sebastián Lelio and Rachel Morrison, among others, Larraín directed the short film "Last Call", starring Chilean actors Jaime Vadell, Mercedes Morán, Delfina Guzmán and Coca Guazzini.

In 2021, Larraín directed his second English-language film, Spencer, a Princess Diana biopic starring Kristen Stewart in the titular role. The film premiered at the 78th Venice Film Festival and received critical acclaim, with Stewart’s performance being lauded by critics and received nominations for the Golden Globe, Critics Choice and Academy Award for Best Actress, apart from receiving several other accolades from regional critics’ groups.

His next project on final days of Maria Callas, titled Maria, starring Angelina Jolie will be released in late 2023.

Personal life 
He was married to the Chilean actress Antonia Zegers from 2008 to 2014. They have two children together, Juana Larraín Zegers and Pascual Larraín Zegers. In the 2013 Chilean elections, Larraín supported Michelle Bachelet's center-left presidential candidacy, despite the fact that his parents are members of the conservative right-wing party, the Independent Democratic Union.

Favorite films 
In 2012, Larraín participated in the Sight & Sound film polls of that year. Held every ten years to select the greatest films of all time, contemporary directors were asked to select ten films of their choice.

 2001: A Space Odyssey (USA, 1968)
 8½ (Italy, 1963)
 Apocalypse Now (USA, 1979)
 Ivan's Childhood (Russia, 1962)
 Ordet (Denmark, 1955)
 Rashomon (Japan, 1950)
 Tokyo Story (Japan, 1953)
 Sunset Boulevard (USA, 1950)
 Vertigo (USA, 1958)
 Vivre Sa Vie (France, 1962)

Filmography

Awards and nominations

Directed Academy Award performances

Larraín has directed multiple nominated performances.

References

External links 

"All Of It Is True" An Interview with Pablo Larrain 
Cinema Today: A Conversation with Thirty-Nine Filmmakers from Around the World By Elena Oumano
"When the Copywriter is the Protagonist. History and Intermediality in Pablo Larraín's 'No'", in "Acta Universitatis Sapientiae, Film and Media Studies", Volume 12, 2016
Jacqueline Kennedy, or “Faciality”: Media Icons and Political Iconography in "Jackie" (2016) by Pablo Larraín''.

Chilean film directors
Living people
1976 births
People from Santiago
Matte family
Chilean film producers
Pablo
ARCIS University alumni